Jean Schmit may refer to:

 Jean Schmit (cyclist)
 Jean Schmit (footballer)